Yusuf Kurtuluş  (born 15 September 1986 in Of) is a former Turkish footballer. He last played for Inkilap SK.

Club career
Kurtuluş began playing football in Trabzonspor's famous youth academy and was a vital member in Trabzonspor's 2003-2004 PAF (reserves) championship side. He went on loan for 2 seasons at TFF Second League side Darica Genclerbirligi to gain experience. Yusuf was called back to Trabzonspor in the 2007–08 pre-season camp where he caught the attention of the coaching staff with his talent. His talent was shown in the UEFA Intertoto Cup where he thrilled the fans and media, with his playmaking abilities and by scoring a goal.

Kurtuluş made only one appearance for Trabzonspor in the Süper Lig before he went on loan to Konyaspor in February 2008, and left Trabzonspor on a permanent transfer to Denizlispor in August 2008.

References

1986 births
Living people
Turkish footballers
Süper Lig players
Trabzonspor footballers
Konyaspor footballers
Denizlispor footballers
Kayseri Erciyesspor footballers
Giresunspor footballers
Elazığspor footballers
Turkey under-21 international footballers

Association football midfielders